Razanaka or Vohipeno Razanaka is a rural municipality in the Brickaville district (or: Vohibinany (district)) in the Atsinanana Region, Madagascar.

It is located near on the banks of the Vohitra river.

Agriculture
Curcuma is widely planted in this municipality.

References

Populated places in Madagascar
Populated places in Atsinanana